Jevišovka is a river in the Czech Republic, the left tributary of the Thaya River. It originates in the Bohemian-Moravian Highlands upland at the elevation of 602 m and flows to the municipality of Jevišovka, where it enters the Thaya River. It is 81.7 km long, and its basin area is 787 km2.

It flows through Častohostice, Blížkovice, Grešlové Mýto, Boskovštejn, Střelice, Jevišovice, Černín, Vevčice, Plaveč, Výrovice, Tvořihráz, Borotice, Hrušovany nad Jevišovkou and Jevišovka. The Výrovice Dam is constructed on the river.

References

Rivers of the South Moravian Region
Znojmo District